The England national netball team toured South Africa in November and December 2019 for a three-match series against the South Africa national netball team. The tour was Jess Thirlby's first international tour as new coach of the England team and was also Dorette Badenhorst's first home series as the new South African coach.

Squads

Matches

First test

Second test

Third test

References

External links
 England Netball

2019 in netball
2019 in South African women's sport
South Africa
International netball competitions hosted by South Africa
South